Burnstein is a surname. Notable people with the surname include:

Ann Burnstein, American bridge player
Eugene Burnstein, American social psychologist

See also
Burnstein-Malin Grocery, a building in Des Moines, Iowa
Gary Burnstein Community Health Clinic, a clinic in Pontiac, Michigan, USA
Bernstein